Mascall is an English surname. Notable people with the surname include:

Dernelle Mascall (born 1988), Tobagonian soccer player
Eric Lionel Mascall (1905–1993), English theologian
Jennifer Wootton Mascall (born 1952), Canadian modern dance choreographer, performer and teacher
Leah Mascall (born 1995), Australian rules footballer
Leonard Mascall (d. 1589), English author and translator
Robert Mascall (d. 1416), English medieval Carmelite friar and bishop
Sharon Mascall (born 1970), British-born Australian journalist